In the 1990s, the Belgium national football team played at all three World Cups, but missed out on Euro 1992 and Euro 1996. They also appeared at three minor tournaments.

The overall match balance is positive with 36 wins versus 30 losses (and 23 draws).

Results
89 matches played:

* Friendly tournament; in 1998 Belgium participated at the King Hassan II Tournament, in February 1999 at the Cyprus Tournament and in May and June 1999 at the Kirin Cup.

References

External links

football
1990s
1990–91 in Belgian football